"So Good" is a song by American rapper Big Sean and American record producer Metro Boomin from their collaborative studio album Double or Nothing (2017). The song features American rapper Kash Doll. It was sent to rhythmic contemporary radio on February 13, 2018, as the second single from the album.

Critical reception
The song received generally mixed to negative reviews from critics. Writing for AllMusic, Neil Z. Yeung considered it a highlight of Double or Nothing and called it "absolutely filthy". Trent Clark of HipHopDX regarded it as the album's most "engaging" track, describing it as "a raunchy parking lot party-starter where Detroit-bred starlet Kash Doll breezes past Sean with a well-manicured appearance, after he shits the bed with the line 'Pussy so good, I never fuck you in the ass.'" Vince Rick of HotNewHipHop gave a favorable review of the song, writing, "'So Good' is the album's standout track. Metro creates the kind of beat you want to lean into and sway, and Big Sean's lyricism is unforgivable (in the best possible way). This track also features, Kash Doll, who drops a sharp, clever rejoinder to Big Sean's alpha-male stuntin' (perhaps the best guest verse on the album)." Conversely, Claire Lobenfeld criticized the song in her review of Double or Nothing, writing: "His feeble attempts at political commentary are, however, less unfortunate than his characteristically gross sex raps of which there are plenty. The most vacuous are on 'So Good'"; regarding the lyrics "I be damned if I didn't 69 / I can hit this shit until I'm 69", Lobenfeld wrote, "It is, at least, a good reminder that no matter how ironic your "nice" joke is, there has probably never been an actually funny 69 joke ever in history."

Charts

References

2017 songs
2018 singles
Big Sean songs
Metro Boomin songs
Kash Doll songs
Songs written by Big Sean
Songs written by Metro Boomin
Song recordings produced by Metro Boomin
GOOD Music singles
Def Jam Recordings singles
Republic Records singles
Universal Music Group singles
Dirty rap songs